Diving at the 2010 Summer Youth Olympics in Singapore was scheduled for the 21 till 24 of August, and consisted of the boy's and girl's 3 meter springboard and the boys' and girls' 10 meter platform. There were 48 competitors total.

Diving took place at the Toa Payoh Swimming Complex.

Qualification Summary  

The first nine ranked divers in each of the four events secured their qualification to participate in their respective diving events. However, each country may only have one male and one female diver representing the NOC.

Boys' 3m

Boys' 10m

Girls' 3m

Girls' 10m

Competition schedule

Medal summary

Medal table

Events

References

External links
 2010 Youth Olympics sports program
 Schedule

 
2010 Summer Youth Olympics events
Youth Summer Olympics
2010
Diving in Singapore